Brávellir (Old Norse) or Bråvalla (modern Swedish) was the name of the central plain of Östergötland (East Götaland), in Norse mythology.

It appears in several traditions, such as those of the Battle of Bråvalla (Battle of the Bravellir), and in Helgakviða Hundingsbana I, where Sinfjötli resides on this plain. Stanza 42:

Its location has been contested because a local tradition places the Battle of Bråvalla at lake Åsnen in the Swedish province of Småland. Bråvalla in Östergötland) and in  Sögubrot af Nokkrum the battle is said to have taken place south of Kolmården which separated Sweden from Östergötland and where Bråviken is located: 

In the legend of Blenda, the army of women assembled on the Brávellir.

References

Locations in Norse mythology
Plains of Sweden
Östergötland